FTPE is an acronym which can stand for:

First TransPennine Express
Fast-tint protective eyewear, a type of photochromic lens
Facility Technical Proficiency Evaluations, a type of test (assessment)
Fashion Technologist and Pattern Engineering, a job title in textile manufacturing
Fédération des Très Petites Entreprises, a French trade organization
Face Tracking & Pose Estimation, a technology used in facial recognition